Athie is a commune in the Côte-d'Or department in the Bourgogne-Franche-Comté region of eastern France.

Geography
Athie is located some 12 km south-west of Montbard and 13 km north-east of Époisses. Access to the commune is by road D4 from Senailly in the north which passes through the village and continues south-west to Bard-lès-Époisses. The D1 road comes from Moutiers-Saint-Jean in the west passing through the village and merging with the D4 then continuing south-east to Viserny. There is a large band of forest in the north-east of the commune with small patches south of the village and the rest of the land is farmland.

The Armançon river flows through the centre of the commune from south to north, eventually joining the Yonne at Migennes. The Reome river flows from the west to join the Armançon in the village.

Neighbouring communes and villages

History
During the French Revolutionary National Convention period (1792-1795), the commune, formerly called Athie-lès-Moutier, took the name Athie-sous-Réome.

Administration

List of Successive Mayors

Demography
In 2017 the commune had 75 inhabitants.

Sites and monuments
There is a Cemetery Cross (15th century) next to a country church which is registered as a historical monument.

There is an attractive garden at the Moulin d'Athie. There is also a magnificent Pietà at the crossroads of Rue Haute and the Grande Rue.

The parish Church of Saint-Cassien contains several items which are registered as historical objects:
Statue: Saint-Cassien (18th century)
Statue: Sainte Barbe (15th century)
Statue: Virgin and Child (14th century)
Statue: Saint Jacques (16th century)
Statue: Christ (14th century)
Tabernacle (15th century)

See also
Communes of the Côte-d'Or department

References

External links
Athie on the old IGN website 
Athie on Géoportail, National Geographic Institute (IGN) website 
Athye on the 1750 Cassini Map

Communes of Côte-d'Or